Chemokine-binding protein 2 is a protein that in humans is encoded by the CCBP2 gene.

This gene encodes a beta chemokine receptor, which is predicted to be a seven transmembrane protein similar to G protein-coupled receptors. Chemokines and their receptor-mediated signal transduction are critical for the recruitment of effector immune cells to the inflammation site. This gene is expressed in a range of tissues and hemopoietic cells. The expression of this receptor in lymphatic endothelial cells and overexpression in vascular tumors suggested its function in chemokine-driven recirculation of leukocytes and possible chemokine effects on the development and growth of vascular tumors. This receptor appears to bind the majority of beta-chemokine family members; however, its specific function remains unknown. This gene is mapped to chromosome 3p21.3, a region that includes a cluster of chemokine receptor genes.

References

Further reading

External links
 
 
 

Chemokine receptors